Rubanda District is a district in the Western Region of Uganda. The largest town in the district, Rubanda, serves as the main administrative and commercial center in the district.

Location
Rubanda District is bordered by Kabale District to the east and north, Kanungu District to the north-west, Kisoro District to the west, and Rwanda to the south.

Overview
Rubanda District was established by an Act of  Parliament on 3 September 2015 and became operational on 1 July 2016. Before its creation, the district was Rubanda County in neighboring Kabale District. The rationale for its creation was to "bring services closer to the people" and to improve "service delivery" to constituents.

The district had an elevated altitude, with volcanic mountains and hills, separated by V-shaped valleys. Lake Bunyonyi, the second deepest lake in Africa, is found in the district.

Population
The majority of the population are Bakiga, with a smaller number of Batwa. There are still smaller pockets of Bafumbira and Banyarwanda in the district.

Mineral wealth
The district has vast deposits of iron ore in Muko sub-county and surrounding communities. The local blacksmiths called "abahesi", are able to make commercial and domestic tools, including knives, pangas (machetes),  hoes and spears. Other minerals found in the districts include wolfram, tungsten, gold and peat.

See also
 Kabale–Kisoro–Bunagana Road

References

External links
 Welcome to Rubanda - the latest of the proposed newest districts
 Rubanda District information portal

 
Kigezi sub-region
Districts of Uganda
Western Region, Uganda